Russian-Tajik Slavonic University (RTSU), also known as Russian-Tajik University, is a university in Tajikistan located in Dushanbe. University was result of cooperation of Russian and Tajik governments. The majority of the students come from Russian families living in Tajikistan and the others are from Tajik and Uzbek families. The university is a member of the Euroasian Universities Association (EUA). Besides being Russian-Tajik the university has students in many nationalities including Armenian, Georgian, Ukrainian and others from Post-Soviet states.

History

It was established in 1996 as one of the branches of the University of Slavic Russia in Tajikistan. At early beginning it was one of the strongest universities after the Tajikistani Civil War and other unrest in the republic. In August 2016, at the opening ceremony of the new building of the university, the President of Tajikistan Emomali Rahmon noted in his speech that over the past years more than 12,000 specialists have been trained at RTSU.

University structure 
The university consist of the following departments
 Law department
 Economics department
 Philology department
 Department of History and International relationship
 Department of Management and IT
 Department of Foreign languages

List of specialties or majors 
 Faculty of Economics
 General business school with major in macro and microeconomics.
 Business school with major on banking industry
 Faculty of History and International relationship
 Culturology
 International relationships
 Faculty of Law
 Lawyers
Crime low
 Faculty of Management and Information Technology
 Applied Information Science in Economics 
 Management
 Mathematics
 Physics
 Biology
 Chemistry
 Tourism
 Faculty of Philology
 Foreign language teaching with major either in English, Chinese or German.
 Chinese language
 Russian language and culture
 Journalism
 Faculty of  Foreign languages

University also provides postgraduate study in economics and philology.

University partnership

The university is partnering in education, culture and science with the following organization:

 American Bar Association;
 European Commission;
 Center of Culture "Bactria" (France);
 Center of Culture "Confucus" (China);
 International Committee of the Red Cross (Switzerland);
 Robert Bosh foundation - Robert Bosch GmbH (Germany);
 Centre for International Migration and Development (Germany);
 German Academic Exchange Service (Germany)
 Other CIS organizations

Notable people

Rectors of the university 
Abdujabbor Sattorov (1996–2006)
Mahmausuf Imomov (2006–2012)
Nurali Salihov (2012–2020)
Tokhir Khojazoda (2020–present)

Known professors
Georgy Koshlakov, head of the Department of Economics and Management

Honorable doctors of the University
 Evgeny Belov – the Ambassador Extraordinary and Plenipotentiary of Russia in Tajikistan
 Maxim Peshkov – the Ambassador Extraordinary and Plenipotentiary of Russia in Tajikistan
 Gennadiy Seleznyov – the Speaker of the State Duma of Russia
 Sergey Mironov – the Chairman of the Federation Council
 Manfred Laurence – the scientist (Germany)
 Chang Yon Ku – the Director of Korean International Cooperation Agency
 Boris Gryzlov – the Speaker of the State Duma of Russia
 Andrei Fursenko – the Minister of Education of Russia
 Yury Luzhkov – former mayor of Moscow
 Valentina Matviyenko - Chairman of the Federation Council
 Sergey Naryshkin - Chairman of the State Duma

Alumni 

 Alex Sodiqov

References

External links
Российско-Таджикский (Славянский) Университет 
Телефоны и адреса РТСУ 

Universities in Tajikistan
Education in Dushanbe
Russia–Tajikistan relations